Sri Ramkrishna Sarada Vidyamahapith, also known as Kamarpukur College, is a college in Kamarpukur, in the Hooghly district, West Bengal, India. It offers undergraduate courses in arts and sciences. It is affiliated to  University of Burdwan.
It was established in 1959.

History
Sri Ramkrishna Sarada Vidya Mahapitha was set up at Kamarpukur, the birthplace of Sri Ramkrishna, in the year 1959 on 15 February under the auspices of a trustee board - the Anur Jana Siksha Samsad. The project was the result of a pioneering effort of Sri Prafulla Chandra Sen and Dr. Bimala Kanta Mukhopadhyaya, the sole purpose being the spread of higher education in the rural backdrops of the area. Since its inception to its present status, Sri Ramkrishna Sarada Vidya Mahapitha has come a long way and has carved out a niche for itself in its aim of imparting quality education to young people for whom the city lights are often a distant dream. The college today has a capacity of about 4000 students engaged in thirteen academic streams, nine in the Arts Section and four in the Science Section.

Over the years the College has come to acquire a name for itself in its academic pursuits amongst the Colleges under the University of Burdwan.

Sri Ramkrishna Sarada Vidya Mahapitha has a sprawling campus with five main faculty buildings, one for the administrative (Vivekanada Bhaban), Meghnath Saha Bhaban (Department of Physics), Prafullya Chandra Roy Bhaban (Chemistry Department), humanities (Bimalakanta Bhaban) and the others for  besides two boys' hostels, a girls' hostel, a well equipped library, modern laboratories for conducting practical sessions for the science students and a highly upgraded computer laboratory enabling students to cope with the requirements of the current job market.

Departments

Science

Chemistry
Physics
Mathematics
Computer Science
Nutrition

Arts

Bengali
English
Sanskrit
History
Political Science
Philosophy
Geography
Economics
Physical Education
Education

Accreditation
Recently, Sri Ramkrishna Sarada Vidyamahapith has been re-accredited and awarded C++ grade by the National Assessment and Accreditation Council (NAAC). The college is also recognized by the University Grants Commission (UGC).

See also

References

External links
Sri Ramkrishna Sarada Vidyamahapith

Universities and colleges in Hooghly district
Colleges affiliated to University of Burdwan
Educational institutions established in 1959
1959 establishments in West Bengal